Weekend War is a made-for-television action adventure war film directed by Steven Hilliard Stern and starring Daniel Stern and Stephen Collins. Written by brothers Dennis and Steven Hackin, it premiered on the ABC network on Monday February 1, 1988.

Plot
The plot concerns a rag-tag group of U.S. Army reservists who are deployed to Honduras to build a runway.  After an intervention by the U.S. Embassy, the crew are then sent to a dangerous nearby village to repair a bridge. The title comes from one particular character's death scene, wherein he remarks, "Two tours in 'Nam I never get hit. This is a lousy weekend war!"

Cast
Stephen Collins as Capt. John Deason
Daniel Stern as Dr. David Garfield
Evan Mirand as Dulcy
Michael Beach as Wiley
Scott Paulin as Rudd
James Tolkan as Dr. Alex Thompson
Victor Mohica
Kidany Lugo
Charles Haid as Sgt. Kupjack
Christine Healy as Elaine Garfield
Charles Kimbrough as Father Leary
Judith Baldwin as Kristen

Reception
Actor Charles Haid called this film Stephen Collins' best performance ever in an interview with The Washington Post. He enjoyed working on the film, saying: "We shot it for 20 days in a jungle in the rain, under the sun, with bugs ... It was great. This time we got to say something. That's why I'm happy I did it: I am actually involved in a project that I believe in 100 percent."

Home media
The film was released on VHS in 1992 by Columbia Tristar Home Video.

See also
List of television films produced for American Broadcasting Company

References

External links

1988 television films
1988 films
American television films
Films set in Honduras
Films with screenplays by Gregory Widen
Films scored by Brad Fiedel
Films about the United States Army
Films directed by Steven Hilliard Stern
1980s English-language films